Mountain Creek is a  tributary of Yellow Breeches Creek in Cumberland County, Pennsylvania.

Course
Mountain Creek starts in the South Mountain Range and Michaux State Forest and flows through them and Pine Grove Furnace State Park. After leaving the state park, the stream runs through Toland and the Holly Gap Marsh Preserve. It flows through the borough of Mount Holly Springs and joins with Yellow Breeches Creek near the borough.

Upper Mountain Creek is impounded by two dams to create mountain reservoirs, Laurel Lake and Fuller Lake.

Tributaries
 Hunters Run
 Tagg Run
 Sage Run
 Iron Run
 Toms Run

Recreation
Mountain Creek is a popular stocked trout stream, stocked with Brook, Brown, and Rainbow trout. In the headwaters and tributaries, there is a fair population of wild Brook Trout.

See also
List of rivers of Pennsylvania

References

Rivers of Cumberland County, Pennsylvania
South Mountain Range (Maryland−Pennsylvania)
Tributaries of the Susquehanna River
Rivers of Pennsylvania